David Fowler,  (born 1 June 1950) is a British environmental physicist, recognized as an authority on atmospheric pollution. He specializes in micrometeorology, the land-atmosphere exchange of trace gases and particles, and the effects of pollutants on vegetation.

Education and career 

Fowler gained a B.Sc. in environmental physics at the University of Nottingham in 1972, followed by a Ph.D. at the same university in 1976, before moving to the Institute of Terrestrial Ecology in Edinburgh (later incorporated into the Centre for Ecology & Hydrology), where he spent the next four decades of his career. He has authored around 250 peer-reviewed papers.

Policy work 

Apart from scientific research, Fowler has also worked on the application of air quality science to public policy in both the UK and Europe. He has been a member of around two dozen scientific committees, including The Royal Society Global Environmental Research Committee (of which he has been chair since 2011), and the Air Quality Expert Group, of which he is an ad-hoc member.

Awards 

Fowler became an honorary professor of the University of Nottingham in 1991, was elected a Fellow of the Royal Society of Edinburgh in 1999, and a Fellow of the Royal Society of London in 2002. He was awarded the CBE in 2005 for services to atmospheric sciences.

Selected publications

References

External links
 

Living people
1950 births
English physicists
Commanders of the Order of the British Empire
Fellows of the Royal Society
Fellows of the Royal Society of Edinburgh
Alumni of the University of Nottingham
British civil servants
Academics of the University of Nottingham
Environmental scientists
Air pollution in the United Kingdom